Copăcel is a commune in Bihor County, Crișana, Romania with a population of 2,297 people. It is composed of six villages: Bucuroaia (Bokorvány), Chijic (Kegyek), Copăcel, Poiana Tășad (Kopácsmező), Sărand (Szaránd) and Surduc (Élesdszurdok).

References

Communes in Bihor County
Localities in Crișana